Joseph Van Muylders (born 5 May 1923, date of death unknown) was a Belgian field hockey player. He competed in the men's tournament at the 1948 Summer Olympics.

References

External links
 

1923 births
Year of death missing
Belgian male field hockey players
Olympic field hockey players of Belgium
Field hockey players at the 1948 Summer Olympics
People from Woluwe-Saint-Pierre
Field hockey players from Brussels